Keerom Regency is one of the regencies (kabupaten) in the Papua Province of Indonesia.  It was formed from the eastern districts then within Jayapura Regency with effect from 12 November 2002. It covers an area of 9,365 km2, and had a population of 48,536 at the 2010 Census and 61,623 at the 2020 Census; the official estimate as at mid 2021 was 62,157. The regency's administrative centre is at Waris. It borders Green River Rural LLG and Amanab Rural LLG of Sandaun Province, Papua New Guinea.

Languages
Border languages (Awyi, Waris, Manem, Sowanda), Pauwasi languages (Emem, Zorop, Tebi), Namla-Tofanma languages, Dera, Elseng, and Usku are the local indigenous Papuan languages spoken in Keerom Regency.

Administrative districts
As at 2010, the Keerom regency comprised seven districts (distrik), but another four districts (Yaffi, Kaisenar, Arso Barat and Mannem) were added subsequently by splitting of existing districts. These eleven districts are tabulated below with their areas and their populations at the 2010 Census and the 2020 Census. The table also includes the location of the district administrative centres, the number of administrative villages (rural desa and urban kelurahan) in each district, and its post code. Note that geographically the first five districts listed below comprise the southern half of the regency, while the remaining six districts comprise the northern half.

Notes: (a) Web, Towe, Yaffi, Waris, and Arso Timur districts have land borders with Papua New Guinea.
(b) the 2010 population for this district is included in the figure for the district from which the new district was cut out.

References

External links
Statistics publications from Statistics Indonesia (BPS)

Regencies of Papua (province)